Eurois astricta, the great brown dart, is a species of cutworm or dart moth in the family Noctuidae. It was first described by Herbert Knowles Morrison in 1874 and it is found in North America.

Subspecies
Two subspecies belong to Eurois astricta:
 Eurois astricta astricta  g
 Eurois astricta elenae Barnes & Benjamin, 1926 c g
Data sources: i = ITIS, c = Catalogue of Life, g = GBIF, b = Bugguide.net

References

Further reading

 
 
 

Noctuinae
Articles created by Qbugbot
Moths described in 1874